Samuel Reddish  (1735–1785) was a theatre manager and an actor in England. He made a reputation with Mossop's company in Smock Alley, Dublin in the seasons of 1761-2 and appeared at Drury Lane, London, 1767, where he remained during ten seasons; acted at Covent Garden, London, 1778, but lost his reason, 1779; died a lunatic at York asylum on December 31, 1785.

References 

1735 births
1785 deaths
18th-century English male actors
English male stage actors
18th-century British male actors